Paul Doty may refer to:
 Paul Aaron Langevin Doty (1869–1937), American mechanical engineer
 Paul M. Doty (1920–2011), American professor of biochemistry at Harvard University